Keo Remy  (born September 13, 1963) is a Cambodian politician who is currently Delegate Minister attached to the Prime Minister, Chairman of the Cambodia Human Rights Committee, Permanent Vice-chairman of the Royal Government Task Force on the Extraordinary Chambers in the Courts of Cambodia, a Member of the National Council for the Anti-Corruption Unit, and a Secretary of State at the Office of the Council of Ministers. He is a member of the Cambodian People's Party. Prior to becoming a Secretary of State, Remy was a Member of Parliament for two terms. He was featured in Joshua Kurlantzick's Charm Offensive: How China's Soft Power is Transforming the World.

References

Members of the National Assembly (Cambodia)
Cambodian People's Party politicians
Living people
1963 births